Caerois chorinaeus is a butterfly of the family Nymphalidae. It was described by Johan Christian Fabricius in 1775. It is found in Suriname, the Guianas and Peru.

Subspecies
Caerois chorinaeus chorinaeus (the Guianas)
Caerois chorinaeus protonoe Fruhstorfer, 1912 (Peru)
Caerois chorinaeus rufomarginata Lathy, 1918 (Peru)

References

 Caerois chorinaeus in archive

Butterflies described in 1775
Morphinae
Nymphalidae of South America
Taxa named by Johan Christian Fabricius